Gonzalo Escobar (born 20 January 1989, in Manta) is an Ecuadorian tennis player. His career-high doubles ranking is World No. 38, achieved on 15 November 2021. He has won three doubles titles with Uruguayan partner Ariel Behar. Escobar has a career high ATP singles ranking of No. 281 achieved on 15 June 2015.

Playing for Ecuador in Davis Cup, Escobar has a W/L record of 8–9.

Career

2018-2022: Three ATP doubles titles and top 50 
Partnering with Uruguyan Ariel Behar, Escobar won two ATP titles at the 2021 Delray Beach Open and the 2021 Andalucía Open and reached three other finals on the ATP tour in 2021 after winning two ATP Challenger Tour titles together in 2020. He entered the top 50 following the final at the 2021 Serbia Open on 26 April 2021. The pair has also won a total of 8 Challenger titles.

Escobar finished the year 2021 ranked No. 38, a career-high doubles ranking.

In 2022, he reached a fourth final and won his third ATP 250 title with Behar at the 2022 Serbia Open defeating top seeds Mate Pavic and Nikola Mektic.

ATP career finals

Doubles: 8 (3 titles, 5 runner-ups)

Challenger and Futures finals

Singles: 14 (6–8)

Doubles: 36 (18–18)

References

External links

1989 births
Living people
Ecuadorian male tennis players
People from Manta, Ecuador
Texas Tech Red Raiders men's tennis
Tennis players at the 2015 Pan American Games
Pan American Games bronze medalists for Ecuador
Pan American Games medalists in tennis
Tennis players at the 2019 Pan American Games
Medalists at the 2015 Pan American Games
Medalists at the 2019 Pan American Games
College men's tennis players in the United States
21st-century Ecuadorian people